In professional wrestling, Living Dangerously was a pay-per-view (PPV) event produced by Extreme Championship Wrestling (ECW) in March annually from 1998 to 2000. The event was also going to be held in 2001 on March 11 that year, but was cancelled due to the eventual collapse of the promotion.

Dates, venues and main events

References